Nir Yusim (born 17 January 1978) is an Israeli badminton player who won National Championships for 11 times.

Achievements

IBF/BWF International 
Men's singles

Men's doubles

Mixed doubles

References 

1978 births
Living people
Israeli male badminton players